In 1949, Billboard magazine published two charts ranking the top-performing songs in the United States in African-American-oriented musical genres.  The Most Played Juke Box Race Records chart had been published since 1945; placings were based on a weekly survey among jukebox operators.  The Best Selling Retail Race Records listing had been launched in 1948, based on a survey of record stores nationwide in which the majority of customers purchased what were then referred to as "race records".  With effect from the issue of the magazine dated June 25, the term Race Records in the titles of the charts was replaced with Rhythm & Blues.  The two charts are considered to be part of the lineage of the magazine's multimetric R&B chart, which since 2005 has been published under the title Hot R&B/Hip Hop Songs.

In the issue of Billboard dated January 1, 1949, different versions of the song "Bewildered" topped the two charts: Amos Milburn's rendition was at number one on the juke box chart while the recording by the Red Miller Trio held the peak position on the best sellers listing.  The following week, Milburn's version of the song took the top spot on the best seller chart, and another of his songs, "Chicken Shack Boogie", moved up to number one on the juke box listing.  Despite the success of Miller's version of "Bewildered", it would prove to be the only charting song of his career.  Milburn returned to number one on the juke box chart in September with "Roomin' House Boogie" and was the only artist with three R&B chart-toppers during 1949.

Three records had lengthy runs at number one in 1949, each topping both the juke box and best sellers charts for ten weeks or more.  Between March and June, "The Huckle-Buck" by Paul Williams and his Hucklebuckers topped the best sellers chart for 12 non-consecutive weeks and the juke box listing for 14 non-consecutive weeks, although it would prove to be the saxophonist's only number one.  The song that replaced it at number one on both charts, "Trouble Blues" by the Charles Brown Trio, topped the juke box chart for a total of 10 weeks and held the peak position on the best sellers listing for 15 consecutive weeks, the year's longest unbroken run at number one on either chart and the longest run at number one on the best sellers chart since it launched the previous year.  Finally, beginning in October, Louis Jordan and his Tympany Five topped the juke box chart for 10 weeks and the best sellers listing for 11 weeks with "Saturday Night Fish Fry" (Parts I & II).  The final number one of the year on both charts was "For You My Love" by Larry Darnell.  The song gave Darnell, who had only been signed by a record label three months earlier, a number one with his first charting song, but his success was short-lived and his chart career lasted less than two years.

Chart history

a.  Two songs tied for number one on the Juke Box chart in this issue.

References

Works cited

1949
1949 record charts
1949 in American music